Ratahi Tomuri, is a floral designer from New Zealand. He is the founder and Master Florist for Tomuri & Co. Floral Design.

In 2005 he graduated from Hato Petera College.

In November 2012 he joined the FFE Group and later returned to New Zealand to establish his own florist. In July 2013 he opened his first store in Sylvia Park before later opening 2 more stores on Auckland's Viaduct and Botany Town Centre. During the period of 2017-2018, Tomuri closed its doors at Sylvia Park and Auckland's Viaduct and now operates solely from their Botany Downs location.

References

Living people
Florists
People educated at Hato Petera College, Auckland
Auckland University of Technology alumni
New Zealand Māori people
New Zealand designers
Year of birth missing (living people)